Cumbala Hill (also spelled Cumballa) is a hill and upmarket neighbourhood in South Mumbai flanked by the sea on the West, Altamount Road on the East, Malabar Hill on the South and Mahalaxmi on the North.

Along with nearby Malabar Hill, Cumbala Hill is home to the most number of billionaires in Mumbai as well hosts residences of prominent ministers. Billionaire Mukesh Ambani's $1.5 billion home Antilia is located here as well as numerous bungalows dating back to the British Raj.

It is also called Diplomat's Hill or Ambassador's Row by residents as many consulates and high commissions are located in the area.

There are two British-era milestones that were once used to guide horse carriages are present in the locality.

Cumballa Hill Hospital was reopened in 2019 after closing down in 2017.

Etymology
According to Richard M. Eaton, the name Cumbala Hill likely derives from Kambata in Ethiopia from where enslaved African Habshis were brought to India in medieval times.

See also
 Breach Candy

References 

Neighbourhoods in Mumbai
Hills of Mumbai